The music of the Philippines includes the musical performance arts in the Philippines and the music of Filipinos composed in various local and international genres and styles. Philippine musical compositions are often a mixture of  indigenous styles, and various Asian styles, as well as Spanish/Latin American and American influences through foreign rule from those countries.

Indigenous music 

Notable folk song composers include the National Artist for Music Lucio San Pedro, who composed the famous "Sa Ugoy ng Duyan" that recalls the loving touch of a mother to her child. Another composer, the National Artist for Music Antonino Buenaventura, is notable for notating folk songs and dances. Buenaventura composed the music for "Pandanggo sa Ilaw".

Gong music
Philippine gong music today can be geographically divided into two types: the flat gongs commonly known as gangsà unique to the groups in the Cordillera mountains and the bossed gongs of Muslim and animist groups spanning the Sulu archipelago, much of Mindanao, Palawan, and the inlands of Panay and Mindoro. The latter were once ubiquitous throughout coastal, lowland Philippine societies before widespread Christianization, and less frequently imports of flat chau gongs from China.

Kulintang refers to a racked gong chime instrument played in the southern islands of the Philippines, along with its varied accompanying ensembles. Different groups have different ways of playing the kulintang. Two major groups seem to stand out in kulintang music. These are the Maguindanaon and the Maranao. The kulintang instrument itself could be traced to either the introduction of gongs to Southeast Asia from China before the 9th century CE or more likely, to the introduction of bossed gong chimes from Java in the 16th century. Nevertheless, the kulintang ensemble is the most advanced form of ensemble music with origins in the pre-colonial epoch of Philippine history and is a living tradition in southern parts of the country.

The musical traditions involving the kulintang ensemble consist of regional musical styles and varying instrumentation transcending the present national borders of maritime Southeast Asia, comprising Buddhist, animist, Muslim, and Christian peoples around Borneo, lesser Sunda islands, Sulawesi, Maluku, Sulu, and Mindanao. It is distantly related to the gamelan ensembles of Java, Bali, Sumatra & the Malay peninsula, and south Borneo, even moreso the ensembles of mainland Southeast Asia, primarily because of the usage for the same racked bossed gong chimes that play melody and/or percussion.

Hispanic-influenced music 
Philippine folk music has some Spanish and Latin American influence, derived from the period the country, along with Guam and the Mariana islands, was ruled from Mexico City and Madrid by the Spanish viceroyalty. It is seen in folk and traditional music, of coastal lowland regions of Luzon, Visayas, and the predominantly Visayan north and east Mindanao alongside the westernmost tip of Zamboanga.

Hispanic music in the Philippines derived from Iberian and some Mexican traditions, owing to the Philippine colony's orientation as a distant entrepôt for resale of primarily Chinese and other Asian luxury goods across the Pacific to mainland New Spain (present-day Acapulco, Mexico). Aside from standardized genres are many precolonial musical forms syncretized with Catholic and general Hispanic idioms, typically involving in religious folk rituals. The Pasyon chants ubiquitous among Christian Filipinos preserve prehispanicized vocal styles, and invocations of patron saints throughout many towns inherited precolonial forms of ancestor and spirit worship. Examples include subli (Batangas), sinulog (Cebu), tinikling (Leyte), and bolibong kingking (Bohol).

Rondalla 
The rondalla is a traditional string orchestra comprising four-string, mandolin-type instruments such as the banduria and laud; a guitar; a double bass; and often a drum for percussion. The rondalla has its origins in the Iberian rondalla tradition and is used to accompany several Hispanic-influenced song forms and dances.

Harana and kundiman 
The harana and kundiman are popular lyrical songs dating back to the Spanish period and are customarily used in courtship rituals. The harana is rooted in the Mexican-Spanish from Spain, traditional and based on the rhythmic patterns of the habanera. The kundiman, meanwhile, has precolonial origins from the Tagalophone parts of the country, uses a triple meter rhythm, and is characterized by beginning in a minor key and shifting to a major one in the second half. But make no mistake, harana and kundiman are stylistically different. Whereas harana is in 2/4 time, kundiman is in 3/4. The formula is verse 1 on minor key followed by verse 2 on parallel major key midway through.

In the 1920s, harana and kundiman became more mainstream after performers such as Atang de la Rama, Jovita Fuentes, Conching Rosal, Sylvia La Torre, and Ruben Tagalog introduced them to a wider audience.

Popular music

Manila sound 

Manila sound is a musical genre that began in the mid-1970s in the city of Manila. The genre flourished and peaked in the mid to late-1970s. It is often considered the "bright side" of the Philippine martial law era and has influenced most of the modern genres in the country, being the forerunner to OPM.

Original Pilipino Music (OPM) 
Original Pilipino Music, more commonly referred to as OPM, a term coined by Danny Javier of the APO Hiking Society, originally referred only to a genre of Philippine pop songs, mostly ballads, that became popular after the collapse of its predecessor, the Manila sound of the 1970s. Currently, the term "OPM" has been a catch-all description for all popular music composed and performed by Filipinos, originating from the Philippines. 

Before the emergence of OPM in the 1970s, popular music in the Philippines throughout the 50s and 60s was a varied showcase for songs with vernacular and movie themes interpreted by recording artists such Pilita Corrales, Sylvia La Torre, Diomedes Maturan, Ric Manrique Jr., Ruben Tagalog, Helen Gamboa, Vilma Santos, Edgar Mortiz, Carmen Camacho, among many others.

Since its origin, OPM has been centered in Manila, where Tagalog and English are the dominant languages. Other ethnolinguistic groups such as Visayans, Bikolanos, and Kapampangans, who make music in their native languages, rarely break into the popular Filipino local music scene, with only a handful of exceptions, which include the Bisrock (Visayan rock music) song "Charing" by 1017, a Davao-based band, and "Porque" by Maldita, a Zamboanga-based Chavacano band. A lot of compositions of Bisrock are contributed by bands such as Phylum and Missing Filemon.

The debut music video of "Oras" ("Time") by Tarlac-based band Mernuts penetrated MTV Pilipinas, making it the first-ever Kapampangan music video to join the ranks of other mainstream Filipino music videos. RocKapampangan: The Birth of Philippine Kapampangan Rock, an album of modern remakes of Kapampangan folk extemporaneous songs by various Kapampangan bands was also launched in February 2008, and was regularly played via Kapampangan cable channel Infomax-8 and via one of Central Luzon's biggest FM radio stations, GVFM 99.1. Inspired by what the locals call "Kapampangan cultural renaissance", Angeles City-born balladeer Ronnie Liang rendered Kapampangan translations of some of his popular songs such as "Ayli" (Kapampangan version of "Ngiti"), and "Ika" (Kapampangan version of "Ikaw") for his repackaged album.

Despite the growing clamor for non-Tagalog and non-English music and the greater representation of other Philippine languages, the local Philippine music industry, which is centered in Manila, is unforthcoming in venturing investments to other locations. Some of the major reasons for this include the language barrier, small market size, and socio-cultural emphasis away from regionalism in the Philippines. An example would be the Ilokano group The Bukros Singers, who swept through Ilocandia in the 1990s and became a precursor for other Ilokano performers into the 2000s, but rarely broke through other music markets in the Philippines.

The country's first songwriting competition, Metro Manila Popular Music Festival, was first established in 1977 and launched by the Popular Music Foundation of the Philippines. The event featured many prominent singers and songwriters during its time. It was held annually for seven years until its discontinuation in 1985. It was later revived in 1996 as the "Metropop Song Festival", running for another seven years before being discontinued in 2003 due to the decline of its popularity. Another variation of the festival had been established called the Himig Handog contest which began in 2002, operated by ABS-CBN Corporation and its subsidiary music label Star Music (formerly Star Records). 

Five competitions have been held so far starting in 2000 to 2003 and were eventually revived in 2013. Unlike its predecessors, the contest has different themes which reflect the type of song entries chosen as finalists each year. In 2012, the Philippine Popular Music Festival was launched and is said to be inspired by the first songwriting competition. Another songwriting competition for OPM music being held annually is the Bombo Music Festival, being conducted by the radio network Bombo Radyo, first conceived in 1985.

Pinoy pop (P-pop) 

From 2010s to nowadays Philippine pop music or P-pop went through a huge resurgence, with increased quality, budget, investment, and variety, mirroring that of the country's rapid economic growth, and an accompanying social and cultural resurgence of its Asian identity. Heavy influence from K-pop and J-pop, Asian style ballads, idol groups, and EDM music can be heard, with less reliance on Western genres, mirroring the Korean wave and similar Japanese wave popularity among millennial (born 1980-1994) and Gen Z (born 1995-2015) Filipinos and mainstream culture. Famous P-pop music artists who define the growth of this now mainstream genre include 4th Impact, Sarah Geronimo, SB19, 1st.One, KZ Tandingan, Morissette, Erik Santos, Yeng Constantino, MNL48, Regine Velasquez, BGYO, Bini, Alamat, Press Hit Play, and PPop Generation.

Other popular music

Choir music 

Choral music has become an important part of Philippine music culture. It dates back to the choirs of churches that sing during mass in the old days. In the middle of the 20th century, performing choral groups started to emerge and increasingly become popular as time goes by. Aside from churches, universities, schools, and local communities have established choirs.

Philippine choral arrangers like Robert Delgado, Fidel Calalang, Lucio San Pedro, Eudenice Palaruan among others have included in the vast repertoires of choirs beautiful arrangements of OPM, folk songs, patriotic songs, novelty songs, love songs, and even foreign songs.

The Philippine Madrigal Singers (originally the University of the Philippines Madrigal Singers) is one of the most famous choral groups not only in the Philippines, but also worldwide. Winning international competitions, the group became one of the most formidable choral groups in the country. Other award-winning choral groups are the University of Santo Tomas Singers, the Philippine Meistersingers (Former Adventist University of the Philippines Ambassadors), the U.P. Singing Ambassadors, and the U.P. Concert Chorus, among others.

Rock music 

The United States occupied the Islands from 1898 until 1946 and introduced American blues, folk music, R&B and rock & roll which became popular.  In the late 1950s, native performers adapted Tagalog lyrics for North American rock & roll music, resulting in the seminal origins of Philippine rock. The most notable achievement in Philippine rock of the 1960s was the hit song "Killer Joe", which propelled the group, Rocky Fellers, reaching number 16 on the American radio charts.

1970s
Up until the 1970s, popular rock musicians wrote and produced songs primarily in English. In the early 1970s, rock music began to be written using local languages, with bands like the Juan Dela Cruz Band being among the first popular bands to do so. Mixing Tagalog and English lyrics within the same song was also popular, an example of which includes the song "Ang Miss Universe Ng Buhay Ko ("The Miss Universe of My Life") by the band Hotdog, who was a primary innovator in the Manila sound scene. The mixing of the two languages (known as "Taglish"), while common in casual speech in the Philippines, was seen as a bold move, but the success of Taglish in popular songs, including Sharon Cuneta's first hit, "Mr. DJ", broke the barrier.

Philippine rock musicians' acts were influenced by folk music and other various cultures, helping to lead to the 1978 breakthrough success of Freddie Aguilar. Aguilar's "Anak" ("Child"), his debut recording, is the most commercially successful Filipino recording, and was popular throughout Asia and Europe, and has been translated into numerous languages by singers worldwide. Asin also broke into the music scene in the same period and was popular. Other similar artists included Sampaguita, Coritha, Florante, Mike Hanopol, and Heber Bartolome.

1980s
Folk rock became the Philippine protest music of the 1980s, and Aguilar's "Bayan Ko" ("My Country") became popular as an anthem during the 1986 EDSA Revolution. At the same time, a counterculture rejected the rise of politically focused lyrics. In Manila, an underground Do-It-Yourself hardcore punk, punk rock scene developed, led by bands like Betrayed, the Jerks, Urban Bandits, and Contras. The influence of new wave was also felt during these years, spearheaded by the Dawn.

1990s
The 1990s saw the emergence of Eraserheads, considered by many Filipinos as the number one Filipino musical artist. The wake of their success saw the emergence of a string of influential Filipino rock bands such as True Faith, Yano, Siakol, The Youth, Introvoys, After Image, Teeth, Parokya ni Edgar and Rivermaya, each of which mixed the influence of a variety of rock sub-genres into their style. A 1990s death metal (Skychurch, Genital Grinder, Death After Birth, Disinterment, Kabaong ni Kamatayan, Mass Carnage, Apostate, Murdom, Exhumed, Sacrilege, Rumblebelly, Disinterment (Death Metal Philippines), Dethrone, Aroma) emergence had bands as prominent fixtures at Club Dredd of the "Tunog kalye" era.

By the ‘90s, the hardcore punk scene had begun to die down in Manila. “All the punks disappeared,” recalls Jep Peligro, creator of Konspirazine, a prominent zine published in the late ‘90s and early ‘00s documenting the local DIY music scene. Still, there were hubs of activity if you knew where to look, such as in Laguna, a province southeast of Manila with a rich DIY punk culture, and the neighboring Cavite region, which is jointly called Strong South known as the Punk capital of the Philippines.

2000s
Filipino rock in the 2000s also developed to include punk rock, hardcore punk, emo, hard rock, heavy metal, and alternative rock, with acts like Razorback, Wolfgang, Greyhoundz, Slapshock, Queso, Typecast, PILEDRIVER, Chicosci, Kamikazee, Bamboo, Franco, Urbandub, Tanya Markova, Kiko Machine,  and the progressive bands Paradigm, Fuseboxx, Earthmover, and Eternal Now.

2010s
The 2010s saw the rise of various unsigned acts of different sub-genres from another format of rock, independent music which included indie acts such as Autotelic, Ang Bandang Shirley, The Ransom Collective, Ben&Ben, December Avenue, IV of Spades, and Munimuni, among others.

Rock festivals have emerged through recent years, becoming annual events for rock/metal enthusiasts. One big event is the Pulp Summer Slam where local rock/metal bands and international bands such as Lamb of God, Anthrax, Death Angel, and Arch Enemy have performed. Another all-local annual event, Rakrakan Festival, is one where over 100 Pinoy rock acts perform.

The neo-traditional genre in Filipino music is also gaining popularity, with artists such as Joey Ayala, Grace Nono, Bayang Barrios, Kadangyan and Pinikpikan reaping relative commercial success while utilizing the traditional musical sounds of many indigenous tribes in the Philippines.

Hip hop 

Filipino hip-hop is hip hop music performed by musicians of Filipino descent, both in the Philippines and overseas, especially by Filipino-Americans. The Philippines is known to have the first hip-hop music scene in Asia, emerging in the early 1980s, largely due to the country's historical connections with the United States where hip-hop originated. Rap music released in the Philippines has appeared in different languages such as Tagalog, Chavacano, Cebuano, Ilocano, and English. In the Philippines, Francis M, Andrew E., Vincent Dapalong, Michael V., Denmark and Gloc-9 are cited as the most influential rappers in the country, being the first to release mainstream rap albums. A new breed of hip hop/rap/trap artists like Abra, Bassilyo, Curse 1, Flict-G, Smugglaz, Dello, Loonie, Shehyee, Shanti Dope, 1096 Gang, Al James, Because, Bugoy na Koykoy, Nik Makino, Honcho, Skusta Clee, Flow G, Ex Battalion, ALLMO$T, and O.C. Dawgs would later follow in the late 2000s and Nowadays.

Other genres 
Many other genres are growing in popularity in the Philippine music scene, including several alternative groups and tribal bands promoting cultural awareness of the Philippine Islands.

Pinoy jazz  
Likewise, jazz experienced a resurgence in popularity. The initial impetus was provided by W.D.O.U.J.I. (Witch Doctors of Underground Jazz Improvization) with their award-winning independent release Ground Zero distributed by the now-defunct N/A Records in 2002, and Buhay, led by Tots Tolentino, in the year before that. This opened up the way for later excursions, most notable of which is the Filipino jazz supergroup Johnny Alegre Affinity, releasing its eponymous debut album in 2005 under London-based Candid Records. The Kapampangan singer  likewise reinvented his persona as a premier jazz vocalist, winning the London International Jazz Competition for Vocalists in 2006. Among the female jazz singer-songwriters, the British-Filipino Mishka Adams became very popular as a flagship artist of Candid Records, releasing two well-received albums.

Other notable names were guitarist Bob Aves with his ethno-infused jazz, and Akasha, led by Mar Dizon, which anchored Monday-night jazz jams during the early 2000s in Freedom Bar, a venue located in Cubao, Quezon City. The spoken-word fusion ensemble Radioactive Sago Project also displayed very strong jazz underpinnings. In recent years, after-hours jazz jams in a venue called Tago Jazz Cafe, also located in Cubao, became an incubator for groups like Swingster Syndicate and Camerata Jazz.

Novelty pop 
Pinoy novelty songs became popular in the 1970s up to the early 1980s. Popular novelty singers around this time were Reycard Duet, Fred Panopio and Yoyoy Villame. Novelty pop acts in the 1990s and 2000s included Michael V., Bayani Agbayani, Grin Department, Masculados, Blakdyak, Vhong Navarro, Lito Camo, Sexbomb Girls, Joey de Leon ("Itaktak Mo"), Viva Hot Babes, and Willie Revillame.

Latin genres 
The prevalence of Bossa nova and Latino music in Philippine popular music had been very evident, in the 1970s, 1980s, 1990s, and onwards. Performers such Annie Brazil and her son Richard Merk, the Katindig family of musicians (Eddie Katindig, Romy Katindig, Boy Katindig, Tateng Katindig, Henry Katindig), Bo Razon, Eileen Sison, and more recently, Sitti, achieved popularity and commercial success with their infectious Latin-derived performances and recordings.

Reggae 

While there has long been a flourishing underground reggae and ska scene, particularly in Baguio, it was only recently that such genres were accepted into the mainstream scene. Acts like Tropical Depression, Brownman Revival, Put3ska, Roots Revival of Cebu, and The Brown Outfit Bureau of Tarlac City have been instrumental in popularizing what is called "Island Riddims". There is also a burgeoning mod revival, spearheaded by Juan Pablo Dream and a large indie-pop scene.

Electronic music 
Electronic music began in the mid-1990s in the Manila underground spearheaded by luminaries like Manolet Dario of the Consortium. In 2010, local artists started to create electropop songs themselves. As of now, most electronic songs are used in commercials. The only radio station so far that purely plays electronic music is 107.9 U Radio. The 2010s also saw the rise of budots from Davao City, regarded as the first "Filipino-fied" EDM, as well as high-profile nightclub venues such as The Palace Manila (BGC, Taguig) and Cove Manila (Okada Manila in Parañaque). Indie electronic producers, DJs, and artists like that of Somedaydream, Borhuh, Kidwolf, Zelijah, John Sedano, MVRXX, MRKIII, Bojam, CRWN, NINNO, Kidthrones, and Jess Connelly have also gained popularity. Some mainstream club DJs, including the likes of Ace Ramos, Mars Miranda, Marc Marasigan, Martin Pulgar, Katsy Lee, Patty Tiu, and David Ardiente, has also made their names on popular club concerts and festivals which featured international DJs.

See also

 Rondalla
 List of Philippine-based music groups
 Manila sound
 Pinoy pop
 Adobo Jazz (anthology series)
 Pinoy reggae
 Pinoy rock
 Pinoy hip hop

References

Sources

Further reading

External links 
 Hardcore Punk Underground in the Philippines 

Philippine music
Performing arts in the Philippines
Asian music